Mariko Tanaka (born 10 January 1993) is a Japanese professional footballer who plays as a defender for WE League club JEF United Chiba Ladies.

Club career 
Tanaka made her WE League debut on 20 September 2021.

References 

WE League players
Living people
1996 births
Japanese women's footballers
Women's association football defenders
Association football people from Tokyo
JEF United Chiba Ladies players